Piracy off the coast of Somalia has been a threat to international shipping since the beginning of the Somali Civil War in the early 1990s. Since 2005, many international organizations have expressed concern over the rise in acts of piracy. Piracy impeded the delivery of shipments and increased shipping expenses, costing an estimated $6.6-$6.9 billion a year in global trade according to Oceans Beyond Piracy (OBP). According to the German Institute for Economic Research (DIW), a veritable industry of profiteers also arose around the piracy. Insurance companies significantly increased their profits from the pirate attacks as insurance companies hiked premium rates in response.

Combined Task Force 150, a multinational coalition task force, took on the role of fighting the piracy by establishing a Maritime Security Patrol Area (MSPA) within the Gulf of Aden and Socotra Passage. According to the International Maritime Bureau, pirate attacks had by October 2012 dropped to a six-year low, with only one ship attacked in the third quarter compared to thirty-six during the same period in 2011. By December 2013, the US Office of Naval Intelligence reported that only 9 vessels had been attacked during the year by pirates, with zero successful hijackings. Control Risks attributed this 90% decline in pirate activity from the corresponding period in 2012 to the adoption of better management practices by vessel owners and crews, armed private security on board ships, a significant naval presence, and the development of onshore security forces.

List of ships captured or attacked off the Somali coast
For more details see: *ECOTERRA Intl. Somali Marine & Coastal Monitor – SMCM updates at:

2005

2006

2007

2008

2009

2010

2011

2012

2013

2017

2018

References

External links 
Live Piracy Map
 Coordination marée noire - List of ships attacked by Somali pirates since 2009
Coordination marée noire - List of ships attacked by Somali pirates since 2011
Interactive piracy map 2013

Somalia
Piracy in Somalia
Somali pirates
Ships attacked by Somali pirates